Tiger Mom (Chinese: 虎妈猫爸) is a 2015 Chinese television series starring Zhao Wei and Tong Dawei. It aired on Dragon TV and Tianjin TV from 3 May to 25 May 2015. The series revolves around a strong-willed disciplinarian tiger mother who faces mounting pressure raising her daughter, while her husband has an opposite view of how to raise their daughter. It marks Zhao Wei's return to television after a 5-year absence.

Synopsis
Qian Qian is the school-aged daughter of Bi Sheng Nan (Zhao Wei) and Luo Su (Tong Dawei). After learning from others that the educational foundation starts in elementary school and witnessing first hand the difficult process of entering a great and prestigious school, Bi Sheng Nan realized that her daughter needs to catch up.

Determined to make sure her daughter is on par with the other kids, she has quickly grown into the role of a tiger mom while her easygoing husband Luo Su maintains that the happiness of Qian Qian is the most important, even if that means being academically behind. Mixed in the bag are two sets of opinionated grandparents and the reappearance of Luo Su’s ex-girlfriend.

Cast
Zhao Wei as Bi Sheng Nan
Tong Dawei as Luo Su
Ji Zihan as Luo Qian Qian
Dong Jie as Tang Lin
Kong Lin as sister Wu
Pan Hong as Sun Ya Xian
Li Kelan as Luo Dan
Han Tongsheng as Bi Da Qian
Cui Xinqin
Han Qing
Li Jia
Guo Kaiming as Luo San Sheng
Wang Sen as Bi Ran
Liu Yijun  as Teacher Tang

Soundtrack

Reception

Salary & ROI
According to New Classic Media's IPO application, Zhao Wei's salary was 42.7925 million yuan, equally 1 million yuan per episode. And the ROI of the show was 300%.

Controversy
After the series, Shanghai Pudong New District Court receiving a case that a man sued Zhao Wei because her stares were too intense in the series. The man alleged that Zhao's stare caused him "spiritual damage".

Ratings 

 Highest ratings are marked in red, lowest ratings are marked in blue

Awards and nominations

International broadcast
The series was picked up by Fox International Channels for global releases.
 China - Dragon Television & Tianjin Television — 3 May 2015
 Hong Kong - STAR Chinese Channel & TVB (dubbed in Cantonese)
 Singapore - VV Drama & Mediacorp Channel 8
 Malaysia - Unifi & NTV7 - 2015
 Taiwan – STAR Chinese Channel & TVBS-G — 31 August 2015
 United States – Dish Network — 2015
 Canada – Rogers TV — 2015
 Thailand – TPBS - 31 May 2018
 Vietnam – HTV7 - September 17, 2015
 Indonesia – MyTV - 1 February 2019 (before My News Prime program)

References

External links

Chinese comedy-drama television series
2015 Chinese television series debuts
2015 Chinese television series endings
Dragon Television original programming
Television series by New Classics Media